Mufumbwe District is a district of Zambia, located in North-Western Province. The capital lies at Mufumbwe. As of the 2000 Zambian Census, the district had a population of 71,238 people.

References

Districts of North-Western Province, Zambia